The American Ethnological Society (AES) is the oldest professional anthropological association in the United States.

History of the American Ethnological Society 
Albert Gallatin and John Russell Bartlett founded the American Ethnological Society in New York City in 1842.  Their goal was to promote research in ethnology and all inquiries involving humans. The early meetings of the AES took place in the homes of the members, where they discussed all aspects of human life, from history and geography to philology and anthropology.  The AES was a scholarly institution, in which papers were presented that were later published.

In the late 19th century, the AES's focus changed from the evolutionary concerns of ethnology to the academic discipline of anthropology. The AES remained small, due to financial difficulties until the 1920s. In 1916, the AES became the American Ethnological Society, Inc.  During this time, it also became associated with Columbia University and linked to the American Anthropological Association. In the 1930s, the AES and AAA jointly published the American Anthropologist, which concerned itself with all four fields of anthropology.

In 1950, the AES went nationwide and started having biannual meetings across North America. In 1972, the new American Ethnologist journal was created to focus on the expanding field of socio-cultural anthropology. In the early 1980s the American Ethnological Society became incorporated into the American Anthropological Association as a sub-section.

Since 2003, the American Ethnological Society has awarded three awards biennially. These are the Sharon Stephens Prize (for junior scholars) and the Senior Book Prize (for senior scholars), which are each awarded for a book "that speaks to contemporary social issues with relevance beyond the discipline and beyond the academy," and the Elsie Clews Parsons Prize, which is awarded to a graduate student for a stand-alone paper based on an ethnography.

American Anthropologist 

The American Anthropologist is the quarterly journal of the American Anthropological Association. The journal advances the Association's mission through publishing articles that add to, integrate, synthesize, and interpret anthropological knowledge; commentaries and essays on issues of importance to the discipline; and reviews of books, films, sound recordings and exhibits."

American Ethnologist 
American Ethnologist is a quarterly journal concerned with ethnology in the broadest sense of the term. The editor welcomes manuscripts that creatively demonstrate the connections between ethnographic specificity and theoretical originality, as well as the ongoing relevance of the ethnographic imagination to the contemporary world." The Editors-in-Chief are Stacy Leigh Pigg and Michael Hathaway (Simon Fraser University). According to the Journal Citation Reports, the journal has a 2018 impact factor of 3.053, ranking it 5th out of 82 journals in the category "Anthropology". American Ethnologist is published in partnership with Wiley-Blackwell.

References

External links 
 American Ethnological Society
 American Anthropological Association
  Register to the Records of the American Ethnological Society, National Anthropological Archives, Smithsonian Institution

Anthropology-related professional associations
Professional associations based in the United States
1842 establishments in New York (state)